William Harry Marshner is a retired Emeritus Professor of Theology at Christendom College in Front Royal, Virginia. He is a former Chairman of the Theology Department and a Founding Professor, who created that institution's theology and philosophy curricula. He has written extensively on Ethics and Thomistic Theology, and is most widely read as the co-author of Cultural Conservatism: A New National Agenda.

Cultural conservatism
With William S. Lind, Marshner wrote the 1987 book Cultural Conservatism: A New National Agenda, which Lew Daly has described as "a new principled framework for policies that would strengthen traditional religious culture". Writing for The Wall Street Journal, Ed Crane noted that the book was significant for its "open break with the Libertarian, individualistic, rights-oriented brand of conservatism" but called it "a deeply, dangerously flawed book". The National Review observed that the book had caused "a considerable stir in conservative circles and in the press" and called the book "intellectually and politically challenging". In her 2002 book Killing for Life: The Apocalyptic Narrative of Pro-life Politics, scholar Carol Mason credited Marshner as one of the "architects of cultural conservatism", which was a distinctive form of conservatism emphasizing morality and "privileging culture over economics".

Personal
Marshner was born in Baltimore August 14, 1943, and earned his Baccalaureate at (the Lutheran) Gettysburg College. He went on to graduate study in Ancient Near Eastern Languages at Yale University with the intention of acquiring the ability to read the Scriptures in their original languages in preparation for a career in the Lutheran ministry. At Yale, Marshner was elected to membership in the Party of the Right and became a prominent leader of Campus Conservatism opposing the Anti-Vietnam War Movement and the Student Revolution of the late 1960s. He subsequently met L. Brent Bozell Jr., and Frederick D. Wilhelmsen at meetings of the Philadelphia Society. At Yale Graduate School, he was given a Bursary job as Night Watchman in Sterling Memorial Library, where he whiled away his night shifts reading Thomas Aquinas. The combined influences of Bozell, Wilhelmsen, and Aquinas provoked a religious crisis, causing Marshner to question Lutheranism and to convert to the Roman Catholic Church. He obtained an Indult to change from the Roman to the Melkite Greek Catholic Rite in 1975.

He left Yale, fed up with the Radical Left-dominated campus atmosphere in 1971 to become editor of Triumph.  He was Contributing Editor to The Wanderer, 1972-75. He subsequently earned his M.A.in Philosophy from the University of Dallas and S.T.L. and S.T.D. degrees from Pontifical Lateran University.

He was married to Connaught Coyne October 19, 1973, with whom he has four children.

From 1977 until his retirement in 2014, Marshner taught theology at Christendom College.

Awards

Woodrow Wilson Fellow, 1964–65;
Yale University Fellow, 1965–69;
Richard Weaver Fellow, 1975–76;
The Cardinal Wright Award, 1979;
Knighthood, Order of the Holy Sepulchre, 1997

Books

 Mary: Redemption and Preservation, Christendom Press, 1981.
 Co-author with several others, Reasons for Hope, Christendom Press, 1982, 
 Coauthor with several others, The Morality of Political Action: Biblical Foundations, Free Congress Research and Education Foundation, 1984.
 Co-author with William S. Lind, Cultural Conservatism: A New National Agenda, Free Congress Research and Education Foundation, 1987, 
 The New Creatures and the New Politics, Committee for the Survival of a Free Congress, Inc., 1987.
 Co-author with William S. Lind, Cultural Conservatism Theory and Practice, Free Congress Research and Education Foundation, 1991, 
 Natural Desire and Natural End: A Critical Comparison of Cajetan, Soto, and Bañez, UMI, 2001, Istituto Giovanni Paolo II per studi su matrimonio e famiglia, 2013.
 Editor, Defending the Faith: An Anti-Modernist Anthology, The Catholic University of America Press, 2016, 
 Translator, Josef Kleutgen, S.J., Die Philosophie der Vorzeit (1860-1863), as "Pre-Modern Philosophy Defended", St Augustine's Press, 2019,

Articles

“Membership in the Church: Fundamental Questions,” Faith and Reason, Vol. 2 (1976) : 54-71

“Criteria for Doctrinal Development in the Marian Dogmas: An Essay in Meta-theology,” Marian Studies , Vol. 28 (1977) : 47-100	

(with J. M. Alonso) “Towards a Relational Theory of Our Lady's Co-Redeemership,” Ephemerides Mariologicae, Vol. 27 : 413-423	

“A Logician's Reflections on the Debitum Contrahendi Peccatum,” Marian Studies , Vol. 29 (1978) : 134-187

“Early Christological Faith: An Ignatian Formula,” Faith and Reason, Vol. 5 (1979): 3-11	

“Critique of Marian Counterfactual Formulae: A Report of Results,” Marian Studies, Vol.30 (1979): 108-139					
							
“The Immaculate Conception and Recent Ecclesiology: i. Prolegomena,” Marian Studies , Vol. 33 (1982) : 124-146

“The Immaculate Conception and Recent Ecclesiology: ii. Christo-conformity, Maternity, and Brideship in Mary as type of the Church,"Marian Studies,  Vol. 34 (1983) : 127-158

“Dignitatis humanae and Traditional Teaching on Church and State,”  Faith and Reason, Vol. 9 (1983) : 222-248

“The Immaculate Conception and Recent Ecclesiology: iii. Mary, the Church, and Sinlessness,” Marian Studies , Vol. 35 (1984)

“The Structure of Platonism and the Dogma of the Trinity,” Faith and Reason, Vol. 13 (1987) : 2-58

“A Tale of Two Beatitudes,” Faith and Reason, Vol. 17 (1991) : 218-233

“Aquinas on the Evaluation of Human Actions,” The Thomist, Vol. 59 (1995) : 355-378

“Can a Couple Practicing NFP Be Practicing Contraception?”, Gregorianum, Vol. 77 (1996) : 677-704

“Implausible Diagnosis: A Response to Germain Grisez,” The American Journal of Jurisprudence, Vol. 46 (2001) : 91-112

“Does Practical Reason Start with `Good' or with `Complete Good'?” Faith and Reason, Vol. 26 (2001) : 339-378

“On the Collaboration between Bishops and Theologians,” Papers Presented at the Conference of the Cardinal Newman Society, November, 2001, published in Peter M.J. Stravinskas and Patrick J. Reilly (eds.), Newman's Idea of a University: The American Response'', Newman House Press, 2006,

References

External links
 
 Marshner's page at Christendom College
 The Xavier Zubiri Foundation of North America

1943 births
Living people
20th-century American Roman Catholic theologians
21st-century American Roman Catholic theologians
Converts to Roman Catholicism from Lutheranism
University of Dallas alumni
Gettysburg College alumni
Yale University alumni
Pontifical Lateran University alumni
Christendom College
People from Baltimore
Catholics from Maryland
American Melkite Greek Catholics
Converts to Eastern Catholicism from Lutheranism
Analytical Thomists